The Virginia Museum of Transportation is a museum devoted to the topic of transportation located in Downtown Roanoke, Virginia, US.

History 
The Virginia Museum of Transportation began its life in 1963 as the Roanoke Transportation Museum located in Wasena Park in Roanoke, Virginia. The museum at that time was housed in an old Norfolk & Western Railway freight depot on the banks of the Roanoke River. The earliest components of the museum's collection included a United States Army Jupiter rocket and the J class steam locomotive No. 611, donated by Norfolk & Western Railway to the City of Roanoke where many of its engines were constructed. The museum expanded its collection to include other pieces of rail equipment such as a former DC Transit PCC streetcar, and a number of horse-drawn vehicles including a hearse, a covered wagon, and a Studebaker wagon.

In November 1985, a flood nearly destroyed the museum, and much of its collection. It forced the shutdown of the facility and the refurbishment of #611. In April 1986, the museum re-opened in the Norfolk and Western Railway Freight Station in downtown Roanoke as the Virginia Museum of Transportation. The museum has earned that title, being recognized by the General Assembly of Virginia as the Commonwealth's official transportation museum.

The Norfolk & Western steam locomotives No. 611 and No. 1218 were originally property of the city of Roanoke due to the museum's original charter. On April 2, 2012, during VMT's 50 Birthday, the city officially transferred ownership of the locomotives to the museum.

The Norfolk and Western Railway Freight Station was listed on the National Register of Historic Places in 2012. The station consists of two clearly identifiable sections, both of which were completed in 1918.  They are the two-story, fifty-bay-long, freight station proper which was built parallel to the railroad tracks and now is oriented south, and the one-story-with-basement brick annex that formerly housed the offices of the Shenandoah and Radford divisions of the Norfolk and Western. The building closed for railroad freight business in 1964.

Galleries and exhibits

Automobile gallery 
Auto Gallery
This exhibit features many automobiles from the early part of the 20th century to more recent vehicles. The oral history display, "Driving Lessons," features stories from individuals associated with car culture.
Many of the museum's antique automobiles are on display here as well. The museum also features occasional special exhibits such as the Hollywood Star Cars exhibit which showcased famous cars from the history of television and movies.

Railroad exhibits 
On-going exhibits cover sundry aspects of railroad life in America, especially Virginia. In addition to these on-going exhibits, the museum maintains an O-Gauge train layout modeled after Roanoke, Salem, and Lynchburg, Virginia.

The Claytor Brothers - Virginians Building America's Railroad
Detailing the lives of Graham and Robert Claytor, this exhibit explores their past and their relationship that led to the merger of the Norfolk & Western and Southern Railways.

From Cotton to Silk: African American Railroad Workers on the Norfolk & Western and Norfolk Southern Railways
This exhibit is the result of an oral history project sponsored in part by Roanoke area businesses and individuals to document the often-ignored roles played by African-Americans on the rails. The exhibit includes pictures, artifacts, and recorded interviews with African-Americans who worked for the railroad.

Big Lick
This exhibit reproduces a 1930s rural train depot, featuring freight scales, a telegrapher's office, time tables, and a velocipede hand car used for servicing track. A brief history of the N&W Freight Station, the home of the VMT, is also included in this space

Aviation gallery
Wings Over Virginia
This exhibit features the history of aviation, particularly as it pertains to the Commonwealth of Virginia. The oral history exhibit, "Flight Talk," features stories from aviation personnel who span the history of flight from the early days into modern aviation and space exploration

Collection 

From January 20, 2011, to May 3, the museum was home to Chesapeake and Ohio 614 as part of the museum's Thoroughbreds of Steam exhibit.
Other pieces include automobiles such as a 1913 Metz, a 1920 Buick touring car, a Highway Post Office Bus, and an armored car used to showcase the United States Bill of Rights in 1991.

Rolling stock 
Though the most prominent pieces of the museum's collection are the two Norfolk & Western engines, there are more than fifty pieces of rolling stock in the collection. Some exhibits may be closed to the public as restoration is in progress on some pieces, while some pieces in need of heavy restoration are stored offsite in yards managed by Norfolk Southern.

Steam
 Norfolk and Western J Class #611, operational since May 9, 2015.
 Norfolk and Western A Class #1218. Built at the Roanoke Shops in 1943. Used in excursion service from 1987 to 1991 and is the last remaining 2-6-6-4 in the world.
 Virginian Railway SA class #4 steam locomotive, the last remaining steam engine from the Virginian Railway. Built by Baldwin in 1910.
Norfolk and Western Class M2c #1151
Norfolk and Western Class G-1 #6, built in 1897 by Baldwin Locomotive Works. Oldest piece of equipment owned by the museum, and one of the oldest Norfolk and Western locomotives still in existence.
Celanese Porter Fireless Locomotive #1
EJ Lavino Company #34, 0-6-0
Nickel Plate Road 763 Sold to Age of Steam Roundhouse Museum, Sugarcreek, Ohio in 2007
Chesapeake and Ohio class H-8 #1604, Transferred to the B&O Railroad Museum in 1986
Norfolk & Western 2156, the sole survivor of the Y6 class, was on five-year loan from the Museum of Transportation in St. Louis, Missouri between 2015 and 2020.

Electric
Virginian Railway EL-C #135
Pennsylvania Railroad GG1 #4919, painted in Brunswick green, currently lacking pinstripes and keystones
 D.C. Transit Company PCC Streetcar (Sold to National Capital Trolley Museum in 2020, slated for operational restoration)
Panama Canal Mule #686 (Cosmetically restored by the Roanoke Chapter of the NRHS in 2020)

Diesel-electric
Wheeling & Lake Erie Switcher EMD NW2 #D3, Donated by Celanese Corporation
Mead Paper Industrial switcher #200
Southern GM EMD FTB Unit
Virginia Central Porter Rod Driven #3
Chesapeake Western Baldwin #662 (Cosmetically restored by the Roanoke Chapter NRHS in 2012)
Norfolk and Western ALCO RS-3 #300
Chesapeake Western ALCO T-6 #10
Norfolk and Western EMD GP-9 #521
Norfolk and Western ALCO C-630 #1135
Norfolk and Western EMD SD-45 #1776, cosmetically restored by Norfolk Southern Chattanooga shops, returned to Roanoke.
Blue Ridge Stone Whitcomb Switcher
Nickel Plate Road EMD GP-9 #532 (donated to Roanoke Chapter of the NRHS)
Southern (Ex Central of Georgia) EMD SD-7 #197 Sold to Southern Appalachia Railway Museum
Conrail SDP-45 #6670, stored offsite
Wabash E8A #1009, cosmetically restored by Norfolk Southern.
Richmond, Fredericksburg & Potomac E8A #1002, stored offsite, stripped of body panels.
AEP #2, GE SL144  (VMTX 70), painted in Virginia tech colors
Seaboard System EMD SW1200 #2289 sold to Southern Appalachia Railway Museum
Norfolk Southern slug #9914; EX Virginian Railway FM Trainmaster turned into a slug unit, stored offsite

Freight cars
Amoco Oil ARA 111 Tank Car AMOX #9465
Depressed Center Flat Car APWX #1002
RF&P Boxcar #2305
Trailer Train Flatcar with Sea Land Containers #470534
Derrick Tender Flatcar # 590374 and Derrick #514925 Crane scrapped in 2017, Flatcar stored offsite
Virginian Railway Hopper Car #107768, stored offsite.
Steam Crane #527665 with Boom Car #514902, stored offsite, Crane scrapped in 2017, Flatcar stored offsite.
Virginian 250 ton Wrecking Derrick B-37 #40037,
Southern Railway boxcar #33348
Southern Railway Big John hopper #8638
Norfolk southern flatcar, currently being used as a stage for events
3 Norfolk & Western hopper cars saved from Virginia scrap and Iron 
Norfolk southern hopper car #23760, 25,000th rebodied car from Roanoke shops
Ex Norfolk Southern Burro crane
Steam Era Norfolk & Western steam crane #514908, stored offsite
VMTX 200298, coal gondola for 611
VMTX 200340, coal gondola for 611
VMTX 66538, coal gondola for 611

Passenger cars
Illinois Terminal "President One" Business Car
Norfolk and Western Baggage Car #1418, stored offsite
Norfolk Southern MOW Dining Car #999000, Sold to private owner
Southern Pullman Sleeping Car "Lake Pearl" # 2422, in primer, lacking southern railway paint
Southern Coach "W. Graham Claytor, Jr." Car #1070, stored offsite
Norfolk and Western Jim Crow Car #1662, stored offsite
VMTX (RF&P) passenger car #513
VMTX (RF&P) passenger car #514 (Open window car)
VMTX (RF&P) passenger car #524
VMTX 9647, former CN baggage car, 611/1218 tool car

Cabooses
Norfolk and Western Class CF #518302 (Can be rented for Birthday parties)
Virginian Class C-10 #321
Nickel Plate Class C-7 Bay Window #470

Other unique rolling stock
Norfolk & Western Dynamometer Car #514780
Norfolk & Western M-1 Post Office Car #93
Norfolk & Western Safety Instruction Car #418. A Theatre car that shows a 1983 documentary produced by Norfolk Southern titled "Going Home" about the restoration of the N&W 611.
Norfolk & Western Tool Car #9647
Norfolk Southern Research Car #31 
VMTX N&W Auxiliary Tender #250001

Automobile collection

Automobiles 
Oldsmobile Curved Dash (1904)
Piedmont Touring Car (1923)
Ford Model T Depot Hack (1925)
Willys-Overland Whippet (1928)
Cadillac Fleetwood Coupe (1936)
Siebert Ford Combo Ambulance/Hearse (1936)
Packard Super Eight (1948)
Studebaker Land Cruiser (1950)
Studebaker President Speedster (1955)
DeSoto Fireflight Sportsman (1957)
Studebaker Lark (1962)
Chevrolet Impala (1963)
Chevrolet Corvair Monza (1965)
Oldsmobile Cutlass Supreme SX (1970)
Volkswagen Beetle (1972) -COMING SOON
Mercedes-Benz 450 SL (1976)
DMC DeLorean (1981)
Ford Mustang GLX Convertible (1983)
DuPont Chevrolet Monte Carlo (1993). A Jeff Gordon car from the 2003 Warner Brothers movie Looney Tunes: Back in Action.

Trucks 
Ford Pickup Truck (1929)
Overnite B-Model Mack Tractor (1960) and Fruehauf Trailer, on loan from UPS Corporation.
Concord Fire Department Oren Fire Truck
Dodge Cab Over Truck
Jeep Oren Industrial Fire Truck
1962 GMC Arlington Barcroft & Washington No. 1319 New Look Bus, on Loan from Commonwealth Coach and Trolley Museum.

Other road vehicles 
Extended Roof Rockaway Carriage
Studebaker Half-Platform Wagon (1870)
Howe Fire Engine (1882)
James Cunningham, Son and Company Hearse (1895)
Freight Wagon "Prairie Schooner" (1900-1915)
F-20 McCormick-Deering Farmall Tractor (1936)
Federal Aviation Administration Tucker Sno-Cat

Aviation collection 
After a storm in 2006, the aviation gallery was rebuilt into a collection of interviews and first hand collections, including:

 Technology of how a plane flies
 Walk-through of the fuselage of a private jet, passenger compartment and cockpit
 Helicopters and emergency transport
 Women in aviation
 Careers in aviation
 Cutting-edge research and development
 Virginia's military bases
 Roanoke's early civilian and military aviators

References

External links

 Virginia Museum of Transportation
 Virginia's Rail Heritage Region

Railway stations on the National Register of Historic Places in Virginia
National Register of Historic Places in Roanoke, Virginia
Aerospace museums in Virginia
Railroad museums in Virginia
Automobile museums in Virginia
Museums in Roanoke, Virginia